Dana Louise Raphael (January 5, 1926 – February 2, 2016) was an American medical anthropologist. She was a strong advocate of breastfeeding and promoted the movement to recruit non-medical care-givers to assist mothers during and after childbirth. She called such care-givers "doulas." The term "doula" (pronounced do͞olə; from Ancient Greek δούλη, a serving woman) was popularized in her 1976 book "The Tender Gift: Breastfeeding."

Early life and education
Dana Louise Raphael was born in New Britain, Connecticut, on January 5, 1926, the daughter of Louis Raphael, who owned a department store chain, and the former Naomi Kaplan.

Career
Raphael received her bachelor's degree and Ph.D. in anthropology from Columbia University in New York City. Having avoided a conventional wedding and refused to take her husband's name (unusual in the 1950s), she rejected the common practise of bottle-feeding, but had difficulty breastfeeding her first-born son.
She learned the word "doula" from a woman in Greece who told her that it fitted the role that Raphael was describing to her of a woman who helps a nursing mother by taking on other work in the home; Raphael then used the term in her 1966 dissertation on cross-cultural practices of breast-feeding before making the term more public in a magazine article in 1969. She gave it more widespread currency in "The Tender Gift: Breastfeeding" in 1976.

In 1975, Dana Raphael, together with Margaret Mead, founded The Human Lactation Center, an institute devoted to researching patterns of lactation worldwide. Dana Raphael was married to Howard Boone Jacobson, with whom she had three children.

Dana Raphael died of complications arising from congestive heart failure on 2 February 2016 at her home in Fairfield, Connecticut.

Selected publications
Books

See also
Nestlé boycott

References 

1926 births
2016 deaths
American women anthropologists
Breastfeeding activists
Breastfeeding in the United States
People from New Britain, Connecticut
Columbia University alumni
Medical anthropologists
20th-century American anthropologists
20th-century American women writers
21st-century American women